Alexey Valeryevich Dzermant, sometimes published as Derman, also Dermant or Dzermanis (was born on , in Talgar, Almaty Region, Kazakh Soviet Socialist Republic, USSR) — is a Belarusian philosopher, journalist and political observer, characterized in non-governmental media as a pro-government political analyst. Until the early 2010s, he was an activist of the neo-pagan movement; currently he is an Orthodox Christian  and staunch supporter of Eurasianism.

Biography 
In 2001 he graduated from the Academy of Administration of the Republic of Belarus and in 2006 he furthered his education at the Institute of Philosophy of the National Academy of Sciences of Belarus. In 2008-2009 he taught at the European Humanities University, in 2007 he started working as a researcher at the Institute of Philosophy of the National Academy of Sciences of Belarus.In the early 2000s, Derman (later Dzermant) was actively involved in Belarusian neo-paganism. Together with  he published the magazine Druvis. Dzermant published the almanac Siver and was one of the founders of the neopagan ultra-right organization Gega Ruch, which was compared to the Ahnenerbe. Dzermant was also an active member of the center of ethnocosmology KRYUJA. He defended the Baltic nature of the Belarusians and widely used the name Kryvia to refer to Belarus. In particular, in 2002, he stated that the Belarusians (Krivichi) are Slavic-speaking Balts and the third Baltic people. He took a critical position with regard to the Eurasian choice for Belarus, stating this in a discussion of the magazine "Baltic Sphere" in 2007 ("It is clear that Belarus is a European country, not Eurasian"); at the same time he proposed two paradigms of self-determination for the republic - through the Central/Eastern European and Baltic (Baltic-Scandinavian) orientation. In 2012, taking part in the roundtable "The Disintegration of Russia: Threats and Strategies for Regional Security," he called the Eurasian Union "more of an economic election declaration," with no prospect of real content.

In the 2010s, his views underwent an evolution: as philosopher Vladimir Mackiewicz put it, Dzermant became a defector "to the pro-Russian camp from a marginal group of Baltic pagans" and a "shifter. After changing his views, Dzermant repeatedly spoke in favor of the integration of Belarus and Russia.

In 2016, Dzermant met in Minsk with the leaders of the Italian neo-fascist party New Force and the right-wing British National Party Roberto Fiore and Nick Griffin.

In the summer of 2020, he said that the one-time deterioration in the quality of drinking water in Minsk could have been sabotage and stated the need to "introduce a state of emergency, cancel the elections and engage in a large-scale purge of the fifth column.. In June–August 2020, against the backdrop of worsening Belarusian-Russian relations, he took a cautious stance, but a few days after the elections he announced the need to abandon a multi-vector foreign policy and completely refocus on Russia.

In February 2021 advocated the banning of the White-red-white Flag.

Public activities 
He is the editor-in-chief of the Internet portal imhoclub.by, a member of the Scientific and Expert Council under the Chairman of the Board of the Eurasian Economic Commission, an expert of the Belarusian pro-presidential Republican Public Association "Belaya Rus", the Russian-Belarusian Expert Club, the project "Citadel". In 2020, he headed the Center for the Study and Development of Continental Integration "Northern Eurasia.

One of the initiators of the "Friends-Syabry" community of Belarusian and Russian journalists. Member of the Friends Club of the Russian Gorchakov Foundation

Performance reviews 
A number of sources note Dzermant's principled pro-government and conformist stance. Some of them describe him negatively as a propagandist.

In 2017, Euroradio described Dzermant as "an ardent defender of the 'Russian world, "Nasha Niva" as a "pro-Russian blogger", Ilya Azar, a journalist for the Russian newspaper Novaya Gazeta, described Dzermant as "almost the only public person in Minsk with pro-Russian views. And the Regnum news agency noted Dzermant's scandalous image.

According to the hacked correspondence of publicist Alexander Usovsky, Dzermant received funding in Russia.

Awards 
 Special prize for finding the value foundations of Eurasian integration in a book from the Eurasian Development Bank.
 "Golden Bison" from the Russian-Belarusian community of journalists and experts "Friends-Syabry"
 Acknowledgement and Certificate of Appreciation from the 
 Honorary diploma of the National Academy of Sciences of Belarus for the active promotion of ideas of interethnic and interfaith unity in the media, strengthening the Belarusian statehood.
 Acknowledgement of the President of the Republic of Belarus for his significant contribution to the implementation of the state policy aimed at protecting the sovereignty, ensuring stability and security of the Republic of Belarus, and consolidation of the Belarusian society.

References

External links 
 Биографическая справка на сайте davedka.com

Politics of Belarus
Belarusian political scientists
Belarusian philosophers
Articles with unsourced statements from September 2021
Living people
1979 births
Pages with unreviewed translations